A virtual mirror or smart mirror is a device that displays a user's own image on a screen as if that screen were a mirror. Some versions feature augmented reality additions to the video display, or use an entirely virtual graphical avatar of the user.

Virtual mirrors are available as mobile phone applications, with some allowing users to modify the appearance of their hairstyle, make-up or accessories. The technology is also used in online shopping and in-store shopping to show people how an item of makeup, clothing, handbag or accessory might look on them. Some major retailers use the technology to provide virtual dressing rooms to customers. These smart devices are used to enhance in-store experience, provide product information to customers and to display marketing and promotional messaging.

Many color contact sites feature a similar virtual try-on environments to simulate the look a user will achieve when actually wearing the contact lenses.

Technology
Virtual mirrors usually utilize computer vision, face detection and face tracking technologies to analyze visual patterns and represent digital information. The technology uses algorithms to collect, analyze and make meaningful inferences from data from one or multiple images.

References 

Mirrors
Augmented reality applications